The South Africa national cricket team toured the West Indies from March to May 2001 to play five Test matches and seven One Day Internationals. South Africa won the Test series 2–1 in the Test series before winning the ODI series 5–2.

Tour matches

First-class: Busta Cup XI v South Africans

First-class: West Indies Board President's XI v South Africans

50-over: University of West Indies Vice-Chancellor's XI v South Africans

Two-day: Jamaica v South Africans

50-over: Jamaica v South Africans

Sir Vivian Richards Trophy (Test series)

1st Test

2nd Test

3rd Test

4th Test

5th Test

ODI series

1st ODI

2nd ODI

3rd ODI

4th ODI

5th ODI

6th ODI

7th ODI

References

2000-01
South Africa 2000-01
International cricket competitions in 2001
2001 in West Indian cricket
2001 in South African cricket